

{{DISPLAYTITLE:Psi9 Aurigae}}

Psi9 Aurigae, Latinised from ψ9 Aurigae, is a star in the northern constellation of Auriga. It is dimly visible to the naked eye with an apparent visual magnitude of 5.75.

The spectrum of Psi9 Aurigae matches a giant star with a stellar classification of B8 IIIe. The 'e' suffix indicates this is a Be star that shows emission lines of hydrogen in its spectrum. This is caused by a circumstellar shell of hot gas. The emission undergoes variability on a time scale of sixteen years.

See also
 Psi Aurigae

References

External links
 HR 2568
 Image Psi9 Aurigae

Auriga (constellation)
B-type giants
Emission-line stars
Aurigae, Psi09
050658
033377
2568
Durchmusterung objects